Myanmar is one of the most seismically active regions in the world. Oblique subduction, block rotation, and a transform margin has been responsible for the seismic activities of the country. The Sagaing Fault is one of the largest sources of earthquakes in the country, having produced deadly quakes in the past centuries. Along the western coast, offshore Rahkine State, the Sunda Megathrust, where the Indian Plate dives beneath the Burma Plate is capable of producing large events and tsunamis like the 2004 earthquake. Intermediate depth earthquakes east of the Chin Range also pose a risk to people. The Shan Plateau is another source of earthquakes, hosting many active strike-slip faults that accommodate block rotation of the Sunda Plate.

Notable earthquakes in the history of Myanmar include the following:

Earthquakes

Tsunamis affecting Myanmar 

 1881 Nicobar Islands earthquake
 1941 Andaman Islands earthquake
 2004 Indian Ocean earthquake

See also

Geology of Myanmar

References

Sources

Earthquakes in Myanmar
Myanmar
Earthquakes
Earthquakes